Oregocerata triangulana is a species of moth of the family Tortricidae. It is found in Colombia.

The length of the forewings is about 12 mm. The ground colour of the forewings is whitish, suffused with brown specks and brown striae. The hindwings are white, tinged with cream on the periphery and strigulated (finely streaked) with pale grey brown in anteroterminal area.

Etymology
The species name refers to the subtriangular patch on the forewing.

References

Moths described in 2005
Euliini